Alien Nation: The Udara Legacy is a 1997 American science fiction television film directed by Kenneth Johnson and written by Renee and Harry Longstreet. It is the fifth and final film produced to continue the story of the television series Alien Nation. It aired on Fox on July 29, 1997.

Plot
The plot introduces the idea that among the Tenctonese slaves, there was a resistance movement called the Udara who were implanted with hypnotic suggestions to act as sleeper agents.  Now, here on Earth, someone has found a way to activate these sleeper agents, and send them out as assassins.

Cast

Main cast

Additional cast

References

External links

1997 television films
1997 films
1997 science fiction films
1990s American films
1990s English-language films
20th Century Fox Television films
Udara Legacy, The
American science fiction television films
American sequel films
Films directed by Kenneth Johnson (producer)
Films scored by Steve Dorff
Television films based on television series
Television sequel films
Television series reunion films